Beyoncé Knowles-Carter (born 1981) is an American singer, songwriter, and actress.

Beyoncé may also refer to:

 Beyoncé (album), her self-titled 2013 studio album
 "Beyoncé", a song by Monét X Change from the 2019 EP Unapologetically